was a Japanese politician. He was governor of Kumamoto Prefecture (1913–1914), Yamaguchi Prefecture (1914–1915), Nagano Prefecture (1915–1921) and Nagasaki Prefecture (1921–1922).

Awards
1916 - Victory Medal

References

1868 births
1958 deaths
Governors of Kumamoto Prefecture
Governors of Yamaguchi Prefecture
Governors of Nagano
Governors of Nagasaki Prefecture